Robert-Marie-Léon 7th Duke d'Ursel (1873–1955) was a Belgian politician.

Family 
He was the son of Marie Joseph Charles, 6th Duke d'Ursel. He married in 1898 to Sabine Franquet de Franqueville. After his death he was succeeded by his son Henri, 8th Duke d'Ursel.

Career 
He was selected to be commissioner of the World exhibition of 1910. During the 1st WW he served as volunteer, and fought in the Yser. He was however sent away from the battle field and became officer in the connection services. The duke was part of the Royal cortege during the victorious entry of the Sovereigns in Brussels. After the war he participated in the Senate in the debates of the reconstruction of the devastated country. The duke was rewarded multiple international honours for his merit.

He had his portrait pâinted by de Laszlo after the War in 1920 in Kensington, they did meet before in an art gallery. Robert d'Ursel was very impressed by the talent of the artist, and de Laszlo gifted the duke a painted sketch of him as sign of respect and friendship. In 1926 he requested to paint a portrait of the dowager duchess d'Ursel, his mother. The portrait was put on display in the Charpentier Gallery in Paris. Both families had close contact, which resulted in 3 generations of portrait paintings of the House of Ursel.

Later he became Lord mayor of Higene, member of the Senate and Special mission of the King, he was sent to the Russian and Danish court. He was active in social circles and was president of the royal Belgian Automobile Club. He was President of the Centre for Fine Arts in Brussels.

Honours 
 Belgium
 War Cross.
 Grand Cross in the Order of the Crown.
 Grand Officer in the Order of Leopold.
 Grand Cross in the Order of the Lion and the Sun.
 Grand Cordon in the Order of Saint Anna.
 Benin: Grand Cross in the Order of the Black Star.
 Grand Cross in the Royal Victorian Order
 Denmark: Grand Cross in the Order of the Dannebrog
 Monaco: Grand Cross in the Order of Saint-Charles

References

1873 births
1955 deaths
Robert, 07
Knights Grand Cross of the Royal Victorian Order
Grand Crosses of the Order of the Dannebrog
Grand Crosses of the Order of Saint-Charles
Grand Crosses of the Order of the Crown (Belgium)
Recipients of the Croix de guerre (Belgium)
Urs
Mayors of places in Belgium